|}

The David Nicholson Mares' Hurdle, currently known for sponsorship purposes as the Close Brothers Mares' Hurdle, is a Grade 1 National Hunt hurdle race in Great Britain which is open to mares aged four years or older. It is run on the Old Course at Cheltenham over a distance of about 2 miles and 4 furlongs (2 miles, 3 furlongs and 200 yards, or ), and during its running there are ten hurdles to be jumped. The race is scheduled to take place each year during the Cheltenham Festival in March.

The race's registered title commemorates David Nicholson (1939–2006), who was successful as both a jockey and a trainer in National Hunt racing. Nicholson's record at the Cheltenham Festival included five victories as a jockey, and seventeen as a trainer.

This race was established in 2008, and in its inaugural year it was held on the final day of the Festival on Cheltenham's New Course. It was switched to the opening day on the Old Course in 2009. It was initially given Grade 2 status and was upgraded to Grade 1 status from the 2015 running. From 2012 to 2019 it was run as the OLBG Mares' Hurdle.

Records
Most successful horse (6 wins):
 Quevega – 2009, 2010, 2011, 2012, 2013, 2014

Leading jockey (8 wins):
 Ruby Walsh – Quevega (2009, 2010, 2011, 2012, 2013, 2014), Vroum Vroum Mag (2016), Benie Des Dieux (2018)

Leading trainer (9 wins):
 Willie Mullins – Quevega (2009, 2010, 2011, 2012, 2013, 2014), Glens Melody (2015), Vroum Vroum Mag (2016), Benie Des Dieux (2018)

Winners

See also
 Horse racing in Great Britain
 List of British National Hunt races
 David Nicholson (horse racing)

References

 Racing Post:

 pedigreequery.com – David Nicholson Mares' Hurdle – Cheltenham.
 racenewsonline.co.uk – Racenews Archive (28 February 2008).
 OLBG.com – OLBG Mares' Hurdle – Cheltenham (15 February 2012).

National Hunt races in Great Britain
Cheltenham Racecourse
National Hunt hurdle races
Recurring sporting events established in 2008
2008 establishments in England